James Love (May 12, 1795 – June 12, 1874) was a U.S. Representative from Kentucky.

Born in Nelson County, Kentucky, Love attended the common schools in Bardstown, Kentucky. He volunteered at the age of 18 and served during the War of 1812. He studied law, and was admitted to the bar and commenced practice in Barbourville, Kentucky. He served as member of the state house of representatives 1819–1831.

Love was elected as an Anti-Jacksonian to the Twenty-third Congress (March 4, 1833 – March 3, 1835).
He declined a renomination to the Twenty-fourth Congress.
He moved to Texas in 1837 and settled in Galveston.
He represented Galveston in the convention, which framed the constitution of 1846, and was the first judge of the Galveston district.
He resigned to become clerk of the United States court and served until the opening of the Civil War. After war was declared, he enlisted and served for two years with the Terry Rangers.

After the war, he was elected first judge of the Galveston and Harris County Criminal Court, but was removed by the military commander.
He died in Galveston, Texas, June 12, 1874. He was interred in Episcopal Cemetery .

References

1795 births
1874 deaths
People from Galveston, Texas
19th-century American politicians
American military personnel of the War of 1812
National Republican Party members of the United States House of Representatives from Kentucky
People from Nelson County, Kentucky
People from Barbourville, Kentucky
People from Bardstown, Kentucky
Burials at Trinity Church Cemetery